Elshad Akhadov  (4  March 1968, Təzə Alvadı, Masally District, Azerbaijan SSR – 11 December 1992, Aghdash Upland, Azerbaijan) was the National Hero of Azerbaijan and warrior during the First Nagorno-Karabakh War.

Early life and education 
Elshad Akhadov was born on 4 March 1968 in Taza Alvady village of Masally District in Azerbaijan SSR. He graduated from the secondary school therein. Then he attended Jamshid Nakhchivanski Military Lyceum. Akhadov was a graduate of Kamianets-Podilskyi High Commanders School. In 1989 he was appointed the commander of one of the Volgograd military units.

First Nagorno-Karabakh War 
Returning to his homeland, Elshad worked at first as a company commander in the Guzdak settlement of Baku and then in the Lankaran district. When the Armenian offensive started he fought in battles around Füzuli, Aşağı Veysəlli, Shishkaya and in other war zones. His last battle was for the Aghdash Upland, and on December 11, 1993, he lost his life heroically in that battle.

He was buried in Taza Alvady.

Personal life 
He was married and had two children.

Honors 
Elshad Akhadov was posthumously awarded the Azerbaijani Flag Order under Presidential Decree dated 14 December 1993 and the title of the "National Hero of Azerbaijan" under Presidential Decree No. 203 dated 16 September 1994.

Taza Alvady village high school and park therein are named after him.

See also 
 First Nagorno-Karabakh War
 List of National Heroes of Azerbaijan

References

Further reading 
Vüqar Əsgərov. "Azərbaycanın Milli Qəhrəmanları" (Yenidən işlənmiş II nəşr). Bakı: "Dərələyəz-M", 2010, səh. 62.

1968 births
1993 deaths
Recipients of the Azerbaijani Flag Order
National Heroes of Azerbaijan
Military personnel from Ganja, Azerbaijan
People from Masally District
Azerbaijani military personnel killed in action